Sara Moonves is an American magazine editor.
She was promoted to editor in chief of W, a fashion magazine, in 2019.  Her appointment stirred vigorous scrutiny and discussion, with The New York Times article about her being entitled "The Most Watched Editor at Fashion Week".

Early life

Moonves's father, Les Moonves, was a television executive, and The New York Times described her childhood as being surrounded by celebrities.  It reported that future actor Jonah Hill was a good friend.

She attended high school in Los Angeles at the Harvard-Westlake school and  earned a degree in journalism from the New York University Gallatin School of Individualized Study.

Career in publishing

Moonves interned at Vogue magazine, another fashion magazine, during her studies, and was hired there, after her graduation.  She left Vogue, from 2010 to 2013, to follow Sally Singer, a senior editor who had mentored her, who had been hired to become editor of T: The New York Times Style Magazine.

She followed Singer back to Vogue to become a contributing fashion editor.

W magazine hired her as Style director, in 2017.  On June 25, 2019, Condé Nast sold W to Future Media, and Moonves replaced the previous editor, Stefano Tonchi.

On March 25, 2020, Moonves called a staff meeting, and told most of the magazine's employees they were being laid off.  Employees in the online department were remaining, but at reduced salaries.  Her boss, Marc Lotenberg, CEO of Future Media, said the magazine had to be put into "survival mode", because “[T]he bottom has dropped out of the luxury market.”

On August 14, 2020, W magazine was acquired by a group of new investors.  They retained Moonves as editor in chief.  Daily Front Row'' credited Moonves with lining up the investors.

References

American editors
American women editors
Living people
1985 births
21st-century American women